Joseph Wilf (1925 – August 3, 2016) was a Polish-American businessman, Holocaust survivor, and the co-founder of Garden Homes, one of the largest real estate development companies in the United States.

Early life
Joseph Wilf was born in Jarosław, Poland in 1925.

In 1950, Wilf, his brother, and their wives, emigrated to the US, and settled in New Jersey.

Career
In 1954, together with his older brother, Harry Wilf, he co-founded Garden Homes, one of the largest real estate development companies in the United States.

In 1964, they founded the Wilf Family Foundation, which later expanded into seven foundations.

Joe Wilf volunteered with and donated to numerous organizations, including Yeshiva University, American Society for Yad Vashem, United Jewish Appeal, Israel Bonds, Jewish Agency for Israel, Joint Distribution Committee, Conference on Material Claims Against Germany, United States Holocaust Memorial Museum and many other organizations.

He was also the first North American chair of the March of the Living, which dedicated the 2017 March of the Living to his memory.

Personal life
In 1949, Wilf married Suzie Fisch in Germany, the daughter of Miriam and Markus Fisch from a pre-war Polish city of Lwów, now Lviv.

Wilf died on August 3, 2016, at his home in Hillside, New Jersey.

References

1925 births
2016 deaths
Joseph
American real estate businesspeople
American people of Polish-Jewish descent
People from Hillside, New Jersey
People from Jarosław
Polish emigrants to the United States